Angelo Tumino (April 28, 1973 - ) is an Italian novelist and poet.

His debut novel Invasione negata ("Denied Invasion") had a great success.  Published in 2010, the book sold 50,000 copies, and was noted for its stark depiction of the relationship of Italians and foreigners in the slums of large cities. The author was accused of racism, and had to be escorted by police during subsequent presentations and conferences.

Tumino worked for several years as a gondoliere in Venice, which provided the setting for American Gondolier (2012).
In 2014 he wrote a novel about Silvio Berlusconi titled L'Invincibile.

References

External links
 https://web.archive.org/web/20131220065235/http://edizionianordest.com/rassegna-stampa/rassegna.html
 http://tribunatreviso.gelocal.it/treviso/cronaca/2010/10/28/news/il-libro-invasione-negata-diventa-un-caso-rischio-incidenti-mobilitata-la-digos-1.1469065

1973 births
Living people
21st-century Italian novelists
Italian poets